Avignon University (French: Avignon Université; formerly known as Université d’Avignon et des Pays de Vaucluse) is a public university located in Avignon, France.

Avignon University is situated on two campuses: the Hannah Arendt Campus, located in the city centre of Avignon, and the Jean-Henri Fabre Campus, which is on the outskirts of town and includes the Agroparc facility for STEM teaching and research, as well as the Avignon University Institute of Technology.

The university is well regarded for its international education outreach, and was awarded the ERASMUS University Charter for Higher Education by the European Commission in 2021.

Avignon University is a member of the Association of Francophone Universities, the European Association for International Education, and the University Network of the European Capitals of Culture.

History
The university was founded in 1303 by Pope Boniface VIII, and closed in 1792 during the French Revolution. It was re-opened as L'Université d'Avignon et des Pays de Vaucluse in 1984 following the 1963 establishment of an annex of Faculté des Sciences d'Aix-Marseille in Avignon. The university was renamed Avignon Université in 2018.

Academics
Avignon University offers bachelors, masters, doctoral, and BUT/DUT certifications in the following disciplines:

 Business
 Computer Science
 Economic and Social Administration
 Economy, Management
 Engineering
 Foreign Languages
 French Literature
 Geography
 History
 Information and Communication
 Languages, Literatures and Foreign Civilisations
 Law
 Life Science
 Mathematics
 Packaging
 Physics, Chemistry
 Public Administration
 Sports

Campus

The Hannah Arendt Campus is located in the heart of Avignon. It includes several historic buildings, including the former Sainte-Marthe Hospital. The Hannah Arendt Campus is principally used for arts, humanities, and law courses. University administration, the Maurice Agulhon university library, and a fitness center are also housed on Hannah Arendt.

The Jean-Henri Fabre Campus is located 9 km (5 miles) southeast of Hannah Arendt. It features more modern buildings and spacious lawns. Being home to the Agroparc STEM facility and the Institute of Technology, the Jean-Henri Fabre Campus is principally used for science and technology courses. It is also home to the Agroparc library.

Avignon University has several Centre régional des œuvres universitaires et scolaires student residences and dining halls, as well as a number of student clubs and organisations.

Avignon University is the place of study for students from 96 different countries, as of the 2018–2019 academic year. International students comprise 13% of the student body.

Notable faculty

Ancient
 Jean de Tulles (died 1608) - university chamberlain and abbott
 Louis Bancel (1628-1685) - Dominican theologian
 Joseph Galien (1699-1762) - Dominican professor of philosophy and theology, meteorologist, physicist, and writer on aeronautics
 Pierre-Louis Moline (c. 1740–1820) - dramatist, poet and librettist

Modern
 Anna Livia (author) (1955-2007) - Irish feminist author and linguist
 Marie-Claude Arnaud (born 1963) - mathematician,

Notable alumni

Ancient
 Honoré Bonet (c. 1340 – c. 1410) - Provençal Benedictine, the prior of Salon 
 Jean-Allarmet de Brogny (1342-1426) - Catholic Cardinal
 Paulus Castrensis - Italian jurist 
 Thomas de Buittle (died c. 1420–1422) - Scottish prelate, clerk and papal auditor 
 Michel de Nostredame, (1503-1566) - astrologer and physician
 Jérôme Nadal (1507-1580) - Spanish Jesuit priest; known as the Ignatian theologian for having developed the theology behind Ignatian spirituality
 Bernado Luis Cotoner y Ballester (1571-1641) - member of the Dominican Order;  Apostolic Inquisitor of Sardinia
 Pierre Gassendi (1592-1655) - philosopher, Catholic priest, astronomer, and mathematician
 Athanasius Kircher (1602-1680) - German Jesuit scholar and polymath 
 Nicolas Saboly (1614-1675) - poet, composer and choirmaster 
 Girolamo Grimaldi (1674–1733) - catholic cardinal who worked in the Vatican diplomatic service
 Dominique Magnan (1731–1796) - learned French abbot 
 Claude-François Achard (1751-1809) - physician and author
 Charles de Ferry de Fontnouvelle (1877-1956) - diplomat and pedagogue

Modern
 Ina Hartwig (born 1963) - German writer, literature critic
 Mehdi Soltani (born 1971) - Iranian actor 
 Vincent Almendros (born 1978) - novelist
 Hamidou Tembine (born 1982) - game theorist
 Astrid Vayson de Pradenne (born 1985) - professional golfer.

See also
 
 List of public universities in France

References

 
Universities and colleges in Avignon
Educational institutions established in 1984
1300s establishments in France
1303 establishments in Europe
1792 disestablishments in France
1984 establishments in France